Szenna is a village in Somogy county, Hungary. It is famous for the Szenna Open Air Museum (Szenna Skanzen), which won the Europa Nostra award in 1982.

Etymology
The name of the village derives from the South Slavic word сено.

Geography
Szenna lies in the Zselic National Landscape Protection Area, 8 km southwest of Kaposvár, in the middle of the Zselic Hill Range.

History
Szenna was first mentioned in the 16th century as Zana and Zenna in official documents as the possession of the Castle of Kaposvár. During the Turkish occupation most of its residents died or flew. According to the 1687 records it had only 1-6 houses. According to László Szita the settlement was completely Hungarian in the 18th century.

The village came into the hands of the Esterházy family in 1715. During the Reformation the population converted first to Lutheranism than to Calvinism. Their first church was built in the 17th century. In 1736 several Hungarian families settled there from Hetes and Kaposszerdahely. At the beginning of the 20th century the settlement was among the richest in Somogy County. They bred cattle, sold woods and transport goods. The village was nationally reputed for its colts.

Main sights
 Skanzen of Szenna - opened in 1978, it was awarded the Europa Nostra Prize in 1982
 Reformed church - built in the 18th century with cassette ceiling decorated with folklore motives
 A local tradition in Szenna, taking place around Easter and dating back to around the 2nd century AD (and during a pre-Christian time in Hungarian tribes), is called the "watering of the girls", a fertility ritual where boys throw buckets of water at young girls running past them.

Culture
The Hungarian folk songs A szennai lipisen and Két út van előttem were collected in 1934 in Szenna by László Lajtha.

Notable residents
 Augustinus Roskoványi (1807 – 1892), Hungarian Roman Catholic Bishop of Nyitra, philosopher, theologian

Gallery

Reformed Church of Szenna

Open air museum of Szenna

External links 
 Street map (Hungarian)

References 

Populated places in Somogy County